Adfacelina medinai is a species of sea slug, an aeolid nudibranch, a marine gastropod mollusc in the family Facelinidae.

Distribution
This species was described from Islas Marietas, Bahía de Banderas, Mexico.

References

Further reading
 Behrens, D. W., & Alicia Hermosillo. 2005. Eastern Pacific nudibranchs, a guide to the opisthobranchs from Alaska to Central America. vi + 137 pp., 314 photos. Sea Challengers, Monterey, California, page 119 as Facelina sp. 1.

Facelinidae
Gastropods described in 2012